San Andrés de los Tacones is a parish of the municipality of Gijón, in Asturias, Spain. Its population was of 216 inhabitants in 2008 and 160 in 2012.

San Andrés de los Tacones is located on the western area of Gijón / Xixón, and borders the asturian municipality of Carreño in the west and with the district of Serín in the south.

In the limit with Cenero is located the reservoir with the name of the district, built in 1970, for supplying water to the Arcelor steel factory of Gijón. Near this reservoir is being built the Zone of Logistic and Industrial Activities of Asturies, more commonly known as ZALIA.

Villages and their neighbourhoods
La Melendrera
El Falcún
La Reboria
La Turriana
San Andrés
La Casa Noriega
La Raposiega
Villar

External links
 Official Toponyms - Principality of Asturias website.
 Official Toponyms: Laws - BOPA Nº 229 - Martes, 3 de octubre de 2006 & DECRETO 105/2006, de 20 de septiembre, por el que se determinan los topónimos oficiales del concejo de Gijón.

Parishes in Gijón